Torget may refer to:

Torget, Hurdal, a village in Hurdal municipality in Akershus county, Norway
Torget, Nesodden, a village in Nesodden municipality in Akershus county, Norway
Torget, Nordland, an island in Brønnøy municipality in Nordland county, Norway
Torget, Oppland, a village in Nord-Aurdal municipality in Oppland county, Norway